Frank Stewart (born 1946) is an American poet and translator.

Life
A longtime resident of Hawaiʻi, he graduated from the University of Hawaiʻi, where he taught from 1974 to 2017.

He is the editor of Manoa: A Pacific Journal of International Writing.

His poems have appeared in Ironwood, Kyoto Journal, Orion, Ploughshares, Zyzzyva.

He lives in Honolulu, Hawaiʻi.

Awards
1986 Whiting Award

Books

Anthologies
American War Poetry: An Anthology (Columbia University Press, 2006)
Honoring Fathers: An International Poetry Anthology (University of the Philippines Press, 2005)
Father Nature: Fathers as Guides to the Natural World (University of Iowa Press, 2003)
Place of Passage: Contemporary Catholic Poetry (Story Line Press, 2000)

Ploughshares

Editor

Frank Stewart, ed. (2003). Wao Akua: Sacred Source of Life. Hawaiʻi State Department of Land and Natural Resources. .

References

External links
"Revealing The Invisible", Kyoto Journal
Profile at The Whiting Foundation
Manoa Journal Staff

1946 births
Living people
American male poets
Poets from Hawaii
University of Hawaiʻi alumni
University of Hawaiʻi faculty